Titius may refer to:

 1998 Titius, a main belt asteroid
 Titius (crater), a 2.7 km-deep lunar crater
 Titius river in Antiquety, Latin name for Krka river in Croatia
 The nomen borne by male members of the gens Titia

People with the surname
 Johann Daniel Titius (1729–1796), German astronomer
 Marcus Titius (1st century), Roman politician